Loabi Nuvevununama (English translation: If I didn't fall in love) is a 2002 Maldivian drama film directed by Ahmed Shimau. Produced under Mapa Films, the film stars Mariyam Nisha, Yoosuf Shafeeu, Mariyam Nazima, Moosa Zakariyya and Shimau in pivotal roles.

Plot
Lahufa (Mariyam Nisha), a vulnerable woman relocates herself to Male' with the help of Adam (Chilhiya Moosa Manik) to flee from an arranged marriage to an old man by her step-mother. She was welcomed with great hospitality by Shakeel (Ahmed Shimau), a heart patient, and his sibling-like-friend, Ziyad (Yoosuf Shafeeu) who instantly falls in love with her. Shakeel's fiance, Nasma (Mariyam Nazima), a greedy woman desperately planning her marriage with Shakeel in need of money, envies Lahufa and tries to spoil her relationship with Ziyad. Soon, he departs to India for a training. One day, Lahufa accidentally drops a glass on his feet, badly cutting his leg which worsens while infection spreads. The couple had to delay their forthcoming wedding which Nasma blames on Lahufa. After several tests, the doctors inform that the injury is beyond healing and advises him to cut off his leg to stop infection from spreading further.

Nasma cancels her wedding and lures Saud (Moosa Zakariyya), Shakeel's friend, in her trap accusing Shakeels has an affair with Lahufa. She accompanies Shakeel to Nasma's house where she reveals that she has no intention to marry a handicapped man. Misinterpreting a phone conversation between Shakeel and Ziyad, Lahufa believed Ziyad is having an affair with Shifana, a girl residing in India, hence agreed to marry Shakeel. A day after their wedding, Ziyad calls Lahufa and proposes her to marry him. Upon returning, he was devastated to discover Shakeel's situation and his marriage to Lahufa.

Cast 
 Yoosuf Shafeeu as Ziyad
 Mariyam Nisha as Lahufa
 Mariyam Nazima as Nasma
 Moosa Zakariyya as Saud
 Ahmed Shimau as Shakeel
 Arifa Ibrahim as Nasma's mother
 Abdul Raheem as Nasma's father
 Chilhiya Moosa Manik as Adambe

Soundtrack

References

2002 films
2002 drama films
Maldivian drama films
Dhivehi-language films